is a village located in Yoshino District, Nara Prefecture, Japan.

As of October 1, 2016, the village has an estimated population of 424. The total area is 155.03 km2.  Nosegawa is said to be the smallest village by population located on the four main islands of Japan.

Geography
Located in southwestern portion of Nara Prefecture, it is surrounded by the Kii Mountain Range. Mount Natsumushi (1349 m) and Mount Arakami (1260 m) are two major mountains in Nosegawa. Many rivers, such as the Iketsu River, run through the village and are eventually united by the Totsukawa River which flows to the Pacific Ocean.

Surrounding municipalities
 Nara Prefecture
 Gojō
 Totsukawa
 Wakayama Prefecture
 Kōya
 Tanabe
 Katsuragi
 Aridagawa

Education
 Primary Schools
 Nosegawa Elementary School
 Junior High Schools
 Nosegawa Junior High School

External links

 Nosegawa official website 

Villages in Nara Prefecture